Rock U (also known as Kara 1st Mini Album) is the first extended play by South Korean girl group Kara. It was released on July 25, 2008. Rock U was released as the lead single.

This was also the first album to feature the two new members of the group; Kang Jiyoung and Goo Hara, following the departure of former member Kim Sunghee. The release also showed a big transition from the group's original "strong female" image to a "cute and natural" appeal, shifting from the R&B sound of their debut to bubblegum pop.

History
After a 10-month hiatus, Kara returned with 2 new members: 17-year-old Goo Hara and 14-year-old Kang Jiyoung. They replaced Kim Sunghee, who left for educational purposes. The song was promoted in the music shows KBS's Music Bank, MBC's Show! Music Core, SBS's Inkigayo and  Mnet's M! Countdown. A new version of the song "Good Day" called "Good Day: Season 2" was released on October 13, 2008 as a digital single. A remix version of the song "What's This" entered in the special edition of the group's second EP "Pretty Girl".

Chart performance 
The Gaon Music Chart was launched in February 2010 as the official chart for South Korea. The album entered at number 81 for the second week of 2010 on the Gaon Album Chart and peaked at number 8 for the week ending July 3, 2010. The album spent four non-consecutive weeks in the Top 10 in 2010 and became the group's second Top 10 album on the chart.

Track listing

Charts

Weekly charts

Release history

References 

2008 EPs
Kara (South Korean group) EPs
Korean-language EPs